Johann Georg Primavesi (1774–1855) was a German etcher and painter, primarily of landscapes.

Primavesi was born in Heidelberg. In 1812 he became a theatrical painter in Mannheim. He was dissatisfied with the artistic possibilities offered there, however, so moved to the royal theatre in Darmstadt. Though well paid, his finances deteriorated; from 1815 he split work with another painter, Sandhaas, and in 1817 he suffered a fire at his house. During this period he took up a correspondence with Goethe. However his fortunes were restored in 1822, as he was appointed to a secure position as court painter in Kassel, where he remained until his death in 1855.

References
 

1774 births
1855 deaths
18th-century German painters
18th-century German male artists
German male painters
19th-century German painters
19th-century German male artists
German etchers
Artists from Heidelberg
Court painters